Devine is an Irish surname derived from Ní Dhaimhín / Ó Daimhín. Notable people with the surname include:

 Adam DeVine (born 1983), American actor, comedian, singer, writer and producer
 Alan Devine, Irish actor
 Alexander Devine, British educator and advocate for Montenegrin independence
 Andy Devine (1905–1977), American character actor
 Andy Devine (English actor) (1942–2022), mainly on British television 
 Annie Bell Robinson Devine (1912–2000), American civil rights activist
 Archibald Devine (1887–1964), Scottish footballer
 Aubrey Devine, American football player
 Betsy Devine (born 1946), American writer
 Bing Devine (1916–2007), American baseball executive
 Bonnie Devine (born 1952), Indigenous Canadian artist
 Candi Devine (born 1959), ring name of Candace Maria Rummel, American wrestler
 Candy Devine, Australian broadcaster, singer and actress
 Christine Devine, American news anchor
 Dan Devine (1924–2002), American football player and coach
 Danny Devine (footballer, born 1992), Irish footballer
 Damien Devine (born 1994), South African speedway rider
 David Devine (athlete) (born 1992), British Paralympic athlete
 David Devine (director), Canadian film director and producer
 Edward Thomas Devine (1867–1948), American professor of economics and social welfare advocate
 Elizabeth Devine (writer) (born 1961), American scriptwriter and producer
 Fiona Devine, British sociologist
 Frank Devine Australian journalist and editor
 George Devine (1910–1966), English theatre producer, manager and actor
 Graeme Devine, Scottish computer game designer and programmer
 Graham Anthony Devine, British classical guitarist
 Grant Devine, Saskatchewan premier
 Henry Devine (1879–1940), English psychiatrist
 Jack Devine, American intelligence operative
 Jack Devine (ice hockey), Canadian ice hockey administrator and radio personality
 Jim Devine, British Labour politician, MP for Livingston 2005–2010
 Joey Devine (born 1983), American baseball player
 John Devine (disambiguation), several people
 Johnny Devine (born 1974), Canadian wrestler
 Joseph Devine (1937–2019), Scottish Roman Catholic bishop
 Joseph M. Devine (1861–1938), North Dakota governor, 1898–99
 Karen Devine, American computer scientist
 Kevin Devine, American songwriter and musician
 Len Devine, Australian politician
 Loretta Devine, African-American stage and screen actress
 Magenta Devine (1957–2019), British television presenter and journalist
 Máire Devine, Irish senator
 Michael Devine (disambiguation), several people
 Miranda Devine, Australian journalist
 Noel Devine (born 1988), American football player
 Pat Devine, British economist
 Patricia G. Devine, American psychologist
 Peter Devine (footballer) (born 1960), English footballer
 Peter Devine (fencer) (born 1976), American fencer
 Rachel Devine (1875–1960), Scottish jute weaver and trade unionist
 Richard Devine, American electronic musician
 Samuel L. Devine (1915–1997), American politician
 Steve Devine, New Zealand rugby player
 Sydney Devine, Scottish singer
 Tilly Devine, Australian criminal
 Tom Devine, Scottish historian
 Winsford Devine, Trinidad and Tobago songwriter

See also
 Divine (disambiguation)

Surnames of Irish origin
English-language surnames

fr:Devine